Laurel Mellin (born April 17, 1949) is an American author of nine books focusing on brain-based health, stress overload, and stress eating, including The New York Times Best Seller, The Pathway. She developed emotional brain training, a method of emotional regulation that rapidly reduces stress and promotes rewiring stress-induced problems.

Personal life 
Laurel Mellin was born April 17, 1949, in Marin County, California. She is a graduate of Redwood High School and holds a Bachelor of Arts in Humanities from the University of California, Berkeley and a PhD in Health Psychology from Northcentral University. She lives in San Anselmo, CA with her husband, Walt Rose, and has three children: Haley Mellin, Joseph Mellin, and John Rosenthal.

Career 
Mellin is a health psychologist and an Associate Clinical Professor Emeritus of Family and Community Medicine and Pediatrics at the University of California, San Francisco's School of Medicine.

Mellin is also the founder of emotional brain training in San Anselmo, California, a method for rewiring stress and promoting resilience. The conceptual bases for EBT is brain-based health, using the executive functioning of the brain to rewire the circuits of reflexive responses in the unconscious mind. The approach is based on optimizing personal control over health and well-being and promoting emotional and spiritual evolution. She teaches UCSF medical students the science and practice of EBT and has authored nine books, and is a New York Times bestselling author. Mellin also directs the nonprofit organization The Solution Foundation, which provides education in using EBT for public health needs.

Emotional brain training 
According to EBT, the tools of the method provide the public with more control over the emotional brain, which traditionally has been seen as controlled by mental health professions through psychotherapy, medications, or procedures. With her colleagues at UCSF (Igor Mitrovic, Lynda Frassetto, and Lindsey Fish), she developed the EBT tools as a public health way to switch off and over time, weaken the circuits that are a root cause of up to 90 percent of health problems. Self-help methods have focused on changing the neocortex, however, the faulty emotional circuits that are a root cause of stress overload (allostasis and allostatic load) are stored in the emotional brain. Cognitive tools are effective in low-stress but not in the high-stress levels that are normal in modern life. According to EBT theory, stress is good for people as it activates faulty circuits and it is only when they are activated that emotional processing can change them. The emotional tools of EBT give users a resource for activating and switching off these circuits to promote well-being and lasting improvements in stress-related emotional, behavioral, cognitive, and physiologic problems. The program is evidence-based with ten studies supporting its effectiveness. In 2011, the EBT research team published a summary of this approach to healthcare: rewiring the stress response.

Published works 
 Mellin, Laurel. The Solution: For Safe, Healthy, and Permanent Weight Loss, HarperCollins, 1998. 
 Mellin, Laurel. The Pathway: Follow the Road to Health and Happiness, HarperCollins, 2003. 
 Mellin, Laurel. The 3-Day Solution Plan: Jump-start Lasting Weight Loss by Turning Off the Drive to Overeat [BURST:] Lose up to 6 pounds in 3 days!, Ballantine Books, 2005. 
 Mellin, Laurel. Wired For Joy!: A Revolutionary Method for Creating Happiness from Within, Hay House, 2010. 
 Mellin, Laurel. Emotional Brain Training: Getting Started with EBT, EBT Basics, 2012. 
 Mitrovic, Fish DePeña, L, Frassetto, L, Mellin, L  "Rewiring the Stress Response: A New Paradigm for Health Care" Hypothesis (9:1-5)
Mellin, Laurel. "Spiral Up!: Train Your Brain to Release Stress", EBT, Inc. 2016. 
 Mellin, Laurel. "The Stress Eating Solution: A Proven, Neuroscience Method for Ending Overeating", EBT, Inc. 2019 
 Mellin, Laurel. "The Stress Overload Solution: A Proven, Neuroscience Method for Optimal Well-being", EBT, Inc. 2019. 
 Mellin, Laurel. "What's my number?": One Simple Question that Unlocks Your Brain's Power for Health, Happiness & Purpose", EBT, Inc. 2020. 
 Mellin, Laurel. "The Stress Solution: A Revolutionary New Method for Emotional Resilience", EBT, Inc. 2020.

References

External links 
 Website: http://www.EBT.org  
 Blog: https://www.brainbasedhealth.org
  Emotional Brain Training Official Website
  Hay House Profile
  Researchgate Articles
  WebMD Biography
  EBT Blog
  Clinical Certification in EBT
  The Conversation Biography

1949 births
Living people
21st-century American psychologists
American health and wellness writers
American women non-fiction writers
Brand name diet products
University of California, Berkeley alumni
University of California, San Francisco faculty
Writers from San Rafael, California
21st-century American women
Redwood High School (Larkspur, California) alumni
20th-century American psychologists